Richard Sandwell (fl. 1377–1397), of Wycombe, Buckinghamshire, was an English politician.

He was probably the son of Mayor of Wycombe, John Sandwell. His son was the MP, John Sandwell.

He was a Member (MP) of the Parliament of England for Wycombe in October 1377, January 1380, and January 1397.

References

Year of birth missing
Year of death missing
English MPs October 1377
People from Buckinghamshire
English MPs January 1380
English MPs January 1397